Bothrops jonathani, known commonly as Jonathan's lancehead or the Cochabamba lancehead, is a species of venomous snake, a pit viper in the family Viperidae. The species is endemic to South America.

Etymology
The specific name, jonathani, is in honor of American herpetologist Jonathan A. Campbell.

Geographic range
B. jonathani is found in Cochabamba Department of southern Bolivia and in adjacent northwestern Argentina.

Habitat

References

Further reading
Harvey, Michael B. (1994). "A new species of montane pitviper (Serpentes: Viperidae: Bothrops) from Cochabamba, Bolivia". Proc. Biol. Soc. Washington 107 (1): 60–66. (Bothrops jonathani, new species).

jonathani
Reptiles of Bolivia
Endemic fauna of Bolivia
Reptiles described in 1994